The firebug, Pyrrhocoris apterus, is a common insect of the family Pyrrhocoridae. Easily recognizable due to its striking red and black coloration, it may be confused with the similarly coloured though unrelated Corizus hyoscyami (cinnamon bug or squash bug). Pyrrhocoris apterus is distributed throughout the Palaearctic from the Atlantic coast of Europe to northwest China. It has also been reported from the United States, Central America, and India, and is also found in Australia. It has been reported as recently expanding its distribution northwards into mainland United Kingdom and eastward on to the coast of the Mediterranean Sea. They are frequently observed to form aggregations, especially as immature forms, containing from tens to perhaps a hundred individuals.

Reproduction 
Firebugs generally mate in April and May. Their diet consists primarily of seeds from lime trees and mallows (see below). They can often be found in groups near the base of lime tree trunks, on the sunny side.

They can be seen in tandem formation when mating which can take from 12 hours up to 7 days. The long period of copulating is probably used by the males as a form of ejaculate-guarding under high competition with other males.

Development
P. apterus was the subject of an unexpected discovery in the 1960s when researchers who had for ten years been rearing the bugs in Prague, Czech Republic, attempted to do the same at Harvard University in the United States. After the fifth larval instar, instead of developing into adults, the bugs either entered a sixth instar stage, or became adults with larval characteristics. Some of the sixth instars went on to a seventh instar, but all specimens died without reaching maturity. The source of the problem was eventually proven to be the paper towels used in the rearing process; the effect only happened if the paper towels were made in America. The researchers could replicate these results with American newspapers such as the New York Times, but not European newspapers such as The Times. The cause was found to be hormones found in the native balsam fir tree (Abies balsamea) used to manufacture paper and related products in America, and in some other North American conifers. This hormone happened to have a profound effect on P. apterus, but not on other insect species, showing the diversification of hormone receptors in the insects. The most potent chemical component was later identified as juvabione, the methyl ester of todomatuic acid, which is produced by the trees in response to wounding; it mimics juvenile hormone closely at the chemical level, defending against vulnerable pests.

Gallery

Possible confusion

Notes

References

External links

 Images of firebugs
 Firebugs in the Channel Islands

Hemiptera of North America
Pyrrhocoridae
Insects described in 1758
Taxa named by Carl Linnaeus